Janina Borońska-Łągwa (born 16 June 1943, Łódź) is a Polish film and theatre actress, and the mother of the composer and vocalist Jacek Łągwa.
Borońska debuted in theater in 1966. In 1967, she graduated from the National Film School in Łódź. She obtained a master's degree in 1969. In 1985 and 2000, she was awarded the Cross of Merit (in silver and gold, respectively).

Selected filmography 

 1965: Return of doctor von Kniprode – girl at Klausen's (episode 2)
 1967: More Than Life at Stake – radio-telegraphist Irena (episode 1)
 1969: How I Unleashed World War II – Elżbieta
 1970: Doctor Eve – Nina, Ewa's intern friend
 1974: Seven sides of the world – mother of Lucek
 1981: The Quack – a daughter of Prokop
 1986: Cryptonym „Tourists” – Masne's colleague (episode 1)
 1989: Janna

External links
http://www.imdb.com/name/nm1291279/

References

1943 births
Living people
Actors from Łódź
Polish actresses